Milikowo  (German Heinrichsdorf) is a village in the administrative district of Gmina Stary Dzierzgoń, within Sztum County, Pomeranian Voivodeship, in northern Poland.

The settlement was founded during medieval Ostsiedlung by a Lokator named Heinrich, who probably came from German-settled Silesia. 

Until 1945 the area was part of Germany. For the history of the region, see History of Pomerania.

The village has a population of 130.

References

Milikowo